Saint-Nizier-le-Bouchoux is a commune in the Ain department in eastern France.

Geography
The Sâne Morte forms the commune's eastern border.

The Sâne Vive flows north through the western part of the commune and forms part of its northwestern border.

Population

See also
Communes of the Ain department

References

Communes of Ain
Ain communes articles needing translation from French Wikipedia
Bresse